The following is a list of Oricon number-one albums of 2020.

Chart history

See also
List of Oricon number-one singles of 2020

References

Number-one albums
Japan Oricon Albums
2020